Belony Dumas (born 18 July 1989) is a professional footballer who plays as a defender for Championnat National 2 club Fréjus Saint-Raphaël. Born in metropolitan France, he plays for the Saint Martin national team.

Early life
Dumas was born in Oullins, France .

Club career
Dumas played in the first round of the 2013–14 Coupe de la Ligue for Boulogne against Créteil on 6 August 2013, missing the first penalty in the shootout that Boulogne eventually lost.

International career
Dumas made his debut for Saint Martin national team on 12 October 2019 in a CONCACAF Nations League game against the Cayman Islands, which ended in 3–0 victory for Saint Martin.

References

External links

Living people
1989 births
Association football defenders
French footballers
Saint Martin international footballers
FC Mulhouse players
US Boulogne players
ÉFC Fréjus Saint-Raphaël players
Championnat National players
Championnat National 2 players
People from Oullins
Sportspeople from Lyon Metropolis
Footballers from Auvergne-Rhône-Alpes